The 2017 São Paulo Challenger de Tênis was a professional tennis tournament played on clay courts. It was the seventh edition of the tournament which was part of the 2017 ATP Challenger Tour. It took place in Campinas, Brazil between 2 and 8 October 2017.

Singles main-draw entrants

Seeds

 1 Rankings as of 25 September 2017.

Other entrants
The following players received wildcards into the singles main draw:
  André Ghem
  Orlando Luz
  Christian Oliveira
  Bruno Sant'Anna

The following player received entry into the singles main draw as an alternate:
  Daniel Muñoz de la Nava

The following players received entry from the qualifying draw:
  Gonzalo Lama
  Tomás Lipovšek Puches
  José Pereira
  Pedro Sakamoto

The following player received entry as a lucky loser:
  Daniel Dutra da Silva

Champions

Singles

  Gastão Elias def.  Renzo Olivo 3–6, 6–3, 6–4.

Doubles

  Máximo González /  Fabrício Neis def.  Gastão Elias /  José Pereira 6–1, 6–1.

External links
Official Website

São Paulo Challenger de Tênis
São Paulo Challenger de Tênis